"Colors" is a song by American singer and songwriter Halsey from her debut studio album, Badlands (2015). It was released on February 9, 2016, through Astralwerks as the album's third single. The song was made available as a 7-inch single and a five-track remix EP titled "Complementary Colors". As of March 2021, the song has reached over 292 million streams on Spotify.

Background

An electropop song, "Colors" was written by Halsey and producer Dylan Bauld (also known as Dylan William). She stated during a performance at the Grammy Museum that she wrote most of the song, as a poem, at age 17, and later adapted it into a song two years later. She also stated it was one of her favorite songs that she wrote. Halsey expressed to Complex magazine; "[Blue is] just my creative color. It's like so many things at once. It's electric, and it's bright, but it's also calm. It's also ethereal. Blue is just an otherworldly color to me. Blue is the sky. Blue is the sea. Blue for me represents the unexplored territory". In another interview, she stated: "My song 'Colors' is about being in a relationship with someone and kind of watching the vibrancy slowly start to leak out of them, watch the colors start to fade, whether they're falling victim to drugs or falling victim to work or any sort of negative behavior that's kind of taking them away from the bright and lively person that they used to be. You can kind of see them start to fade to gray, and you wish you had them back the way that they used to be".

On January 21, 2016, Halsey revealed the single's artwork via Twitter. The art had been painted on the side of a building located at the intersection of Franklin Street and Meserole Avenue in Williamsburg, Brooklyn. The picture features a black human silhouette standing in front of a dark green background. Lilac paint splashes around the head of the figure, which is a reference to the song's bridge. Upon its release, MTV's contributor Madeline Roth compared the reveal to the advertising campaign preceding Justin Bieber's album Purpose.

Music video
A music video for the single was directed by Tim Mattia and released on February 25, 2016. Prior to its release, Halsey unveiled two teasers of the music video on her Twitter and Facebook account. She also announced that the video would premiere on February 25, 2016, and would co-star actor Tyler Posey.

The video received a positive reception upon release, with critics mainly focusing on the video's plot twist. Nylon contrasted the song's "dreamy nature" with the video's roller coaster storyline.

The music video was filmed in 1120 Westchester Place. As of June 2022, the music video has received over 250 million views on YouTube.

Live performances
"Colors" was promoted by Halsey in a number of live appearances, including Jimmy Kimmel Live, Boston Calling Music Festival and at 02 Academy Islington, London. She also  performed the song at the Billboard Women in Music 2016 event. In 2017, she performed the song at the ACLU benefit event.

Track listing
Digital EP – "Complementary Colors"
"Colors" (Stripped) – 4:26
"Colors" (Audien Remix) – 4:30
"Colors" (Sam Feldt Remix) – 4:46
"Colors" (Blonde Remix) – 4:58
"Colors" (Joel Fletcher & Nathan Thomson Remix) – 4:11

Limited-edition 7-inch single
A. "Colors" – 4:09
B. "Colors" (Stripped) – 4:26

Exclusive signed CD for "Camp Badlands" VIP Package
"Colors" (Radio Edit) – 3:30
"Colors" (Stripped) – 2:57
"Garden" (Demo) – 3:00

Charts

Certifications

Release history

References

2015 songs
2016 singles
Halsey (singer) songs
Astralwerks singles
Capitol Records singles
Songs written by Halsey (singer)